Pseudonoorda flammea is a moth in the family Crambidae. It was described by Koen V. N. Maes in 2012. It is found in Cameroon and the Democratic Republic of the Congo (Bas Congo).

References

Moths described in 2012
Odontiinae